Sack is a surname. Notable people with the surname include:

 August Friedrich Wilhelm Sack (1703–1786), German Reformed preacher and theologian
 Simon Heinrich Sack (1723–1791), German Privy Councillor to Frederick II of Prussia
 Friedrich Samuel Gottfried Sack (1738–1817), German Reformed theologian
 Karl Heinrich Sack (1789–1875), German Protestant theologian and university professor
 Karl Sack (1896–1946), German jurist and member of the anti-Nazi resistance movement in World War II
 Erna Sack (1898–1972), German opera singer (soprano)
 Jack Sack (1902–1980), American football player and coach
 John Sack (1930–2004), American journalist
 Sibylle Kemmler-Sack (1934–1999), German chemist
 Robert D. Sack (born 1939), American judge
 Robert L. Sack (born 1942), American physician
 Steve Sack (born 1953), American editorial cartoonist
 Brian Sack (born 1968), American actor and humorist
 Peter Sack (born 1979), German shot putter

Fictional characters:
 Johnny Sack, character in The Sopranos

Surnames of German origin
German-language surnames